Air Ferry Limited was a private, independent British airline operating charter, scheduled and all-cargo flights from 1963 to 1968.

History
Wing Commander Hugh Kennard, the Air Kruise founder and a former Silver City Airways director, and Leroy Tours founder Lewis Leroy formed Air Ferry Ltd in 1961 as a subsidiary of Leroy Tours to operate general charter and inclusive tour (IT) flights.

Air Ferry started operations on 1 April 1963, providing IT charters from Manston Airport near Ramsgate, Kent, in south east England. It initially operated two 40-seat Vickers Viking and two 80-seat Douglas DC-4/C-54s piston airliners. Before the start of operations, the Air Transport Licensing Board (ATLB) had awarded Air Ferry three A-type licences to operate scheduled services from Manston to Le Touquet, Ostend and Verona. Services to Le Touquet and Ostend were due to begin in mid-April 1963 and to Verona on 1 April 1964. (Scheduled vehicle ferry and all-cargo services did eventually start in 1965. These operated between Manston and Le Touquet, Calais, Ostend as well as Rotterdam.)

Air Ferry added a third DC-4, more Vikings, a Bristol Freighter, and a pair of Douglas DC-6As to its fleet over the coming years. The latter were the airline's first pressurised aircraft.

In October 1964 Air Ferry's ownership passed to Air Holdings as a consequence of the latter's acquisition of Leroy Tours. At the time, Air Holdings was the parent company of British United Airways (BUA), Britain's largest contemporary independent airline and leading private sector scheduled carrier. This made Air Ferry an associate of BUA. Air Holdings' takeover of Air Ferry restored the cross-Channel vehicle ferry services monopoly of British United Air Ferries, a sister airline of BUA.

In 1968 Air Ferry leased a pair of Vickers Viscount 800s. By that time, it operated scheduled and non-scheduled services carrying passengers and their cars as well as cargo from Manchester, Bristol and London in addition to Manston. Summer 1968 was Air Ferry's last season of operations, and the airline ceased trading on 31 October 1968.

Aircraft operated
Air Ferry operated the following aircraft types:

 Aviation Traders ATL-98 Carvair (leased)
 Bristol 170 Freighter
 Douglas DC-4/Douglas C-54 Skymaster
 Douglas DC-6
 Vickers Viking
 Vickers Viscount

Fleet in 1965
In April 1965 the Air Ferry fleet comprised 9 aircraft.

Fleet in 1968
In April 1968 the Air Ferry fleet comprised 6 aircraft.

Accidents and incidents
 On 21 January 1967 a Douglas C-54 Skymaster registered G-ASOG operating a cargo flight from Manchester to Frankfurt in Germany struck trees while executing a night-time approach, resulting in the death of both crew members.
 1967 Air Ferry DC-4 accident - On 3 June 1967 a Douglas C-54A Skymaster registered G-APYK operating a non-scheduled passenger flight from Manston to Perpignan in France struck the Canigou mountain at 4,000 feet while in the descent, killing all 88 occupants (five crew and 83 passengers). Cause of the accident was determined to be carbon monoxide poisoning of the flight crew due to a faulty cabin heater.

See also
 List of defunct airlines of the United Kingdom

Notes

References
 
  (various backdated issues relating to Air Ferry Ltd, 1961-1968)

External links
 Air Ferry at the Aviation Safety Network Database

Defunct airlines of the United Kingdom
Airlines established in 1961
Airlines disestablished in 1968
1961 establishments in England
1968 disestablishments in England
British companies disestablished in 1968
British companies established in 1961